Botswana women's national softball team is the national team for Botswana. The team competed at the 1994 ISF Women's World Championship in St. John's, Newfoundland where they finished eighteenth.  The team competed at the 2006 ISF Women's World Championship in Beijing, China where they finished fourteenth. The team competed at the 2010 ISF Women's World Championship in Caracas, Venezuela where they finished sixteenth.

References

External links 
 International Softball Federation

Women's national softball teams
Women's national sports teams of Botswana
Softball in Botswana